Salim Langde Pe Mat Ro is a 1989 Indian film directed by Saeed Akhtar Mirza, with Pavan Malhotra as lead. The film won  Best Feature Film in Hindi and Best Cinematography at 37th National Film Awards.

Plot 
The film is set in the period of the 1980s. The story revolves around Salim Pasha, a man with a physical disability. He is involved in crimes like extortion and robbery with two of his friends Peera and Abdul. Salim is a carefree man. He lives with his parents and his younger sister. 
Salim's younger brother Javed Pasha (who has been a hard-working  student all his life) dies because of an electric shock. His parents are keen to get his younger sister married to a proofreader of a Urdu newspaper named Aslam. 

After watching a documentary film made on the communal riots of Bhiwandi, Salim is shaken from within. He wants to give up everything he does and start life afresh. Salim tries to look for a job and ends up with a job at a garage with the help of a restaurant owner. Salim happily goes to Aslam to tell about the way he would start up his new life. 
Salim is asked to stir up a riot for a huge sum of money. He refuses to do so and tells them how he is devastated since he has seen the outcome of  Bhiwandi communal riots. 
On the day of his younger sister's engagement with Aslam, Salim is seen happily dancing with his friends. During the celebrations of his sister's engagement ceremony, he is killed by one of his rivals.

Cast 
 Pavan Malhotra as Salim, the Lame (Langda)
 Makrand Deshpande as Peera
 Ashutosh Gowariker as Abdul
 Rajendra Gupta as Aslam
 Neelima Azeem as Mumtaz
 Vikram Gokhale as Salim's father
 Surekha Sikri as Amina, Salim's mother
 Nishigandha Wad as Anees, Salim's Sister
 Haidar Ali as Nathu Seth
 Shakti Singh as Rajan
 Tom Alter as Johan
 Ajit Vachani as Rafiq bhai
 Neeraj Vora as Churan miya
 Naresh Suri as police inspector
 Achyut Potdar as Lala
 Ashok Banthia as Vilas Nakkashe

Awards 
 National Film Awards–1989
National Film Award for Best Feature Film in Hindi
National Film Award for Best Cinematography: Virendra Saini

1989
Tokyo International Film Festival

References

External links 

 

1989 films
1989 crime drama films
1980s Hindi-language films
Indian crime drama films
Films about religious violence in India
Films whose cinematographer won the Best Cinematography National Film Award
Best Hindi Feature Film National Film Award winners
Films directed by Saeed Akhtar Mirza
National Film Development Corporation of India films